Manav Rachna University is a private university located in Faridabad, Haryana, India. It was established as Manav Rachna College of Engineering (MRCE) in 2004 and became a university in 2014.

Campus

Academics
The university offers three-year Bachelor of Business Administration and Bachelor of Science (Honors) as well as four-year Bachelor of Technology in various fields. It also offers two-year postgraduate programmes which grant Master of Business Administration, Master of Science or Master of Technology. PhD programs are also offered.

ECO College
The E-cell of MRU in association with National Entrepreneurial Network organizes various entrepreneurial awareness campaigns and activities to groom the future entrepreneurs.

Foreign collaborations
Collaborations has been made with international Institutes such as Lahti University of Applied Sciences, Algonquin College, University of Central Lancashire and Auckland Institute of Technology to share curricula, teaching pedagogy, student projects, research and development, faculty and student exchange, expert lectures, and twinning programmes. These collaborations has been made jointly with other Manav Rachna Educational Institutions.

Extracurricular activities
The institute has constituted four committees to encourage student participation in extracurricular activities, namely technical, literary, sports and cultural. The annual technical cum cultural fest is organized by the student's committee.

Microsoft Imagine Cup
MRU has consistently represented India and won at Microsoft Imagine Cup.
2013
Team "Path Finders" mentored by Manasvi Sihag and consisting of Nikhil Dalmia, Prashant Gupta, Pritam Singh and Hardik Garg won the Indian Finals in 2013 under both "World Citizenship" and "Innovation" category and represented India at the world finals held at St. Petersburg, Russia with their project Swasthya Sanjivani. Swasthya Sanjivani is an affordable, quick and automated blood and urine testing system with immediate confirmatory results covering diseases such as anemia, diabetes, jaundice and renal damage. For this achievement the team was later honored with Dr. O.P. Bhalla Award of Excellence.

2014
The team "CodeBlue" represented India at the world finals for Apps for Office Challenge held at Seattle, Washington and won the second prize. The team created an application for Microsoft Word called Molecule Maker which helps in creating dynamic 3D structures of molecules once the user has inputted its molecular formula. The team was mentored by Mohit Bahl and consisted of Saurabh Kanwar, Neha Valecha, Ankur Bhalla and Jehi Jha.

2015
In Microsoft Imagine Cup 2015, teams from Manav Rachna College of Engineering won the first prize in the India finals in both games and innovation category. The games category winning team was team "Aether", composed of Saurabh Kanwar, Nikhil Dalmia, Priya Dugaya and Himanshi Badhana and they created a Windows Phone game called Tydee that focused on teaching people garbage segregation and waste management. The innovation category winner was team Eyeluminati who created the project Manovue. Team Eyeluminati went on to represent India in the world finals held at Seattle, Washington. It went on to win the World Health Summit Startup Award 2018.

References

External links 
 

Universities in Haryana
Engineering colleges in Haryana
All India Council for Technical Education
Educational institutions established in 2014
Education in Faridabad
2014 establishments in Haryana